A++ stands for abstraction plus reference plus synthesis which is used as a name for the minimalistic programming language that is built on ARS-based programming. ARS-based programming is used as a name for programming which consists mainly of applying patterns derived from ARS to programming in any language. ARS is an abstraction from the Lambda Calculus, taking its three basic operations, and giving them a more general meaning, thus providing a foundation for the three major programming paradigms functional programming, object-oriented programming and imperative programming.

The technical texts in this article are taken from the online version of the 1st edition of the A++-book published in 2004. The 2nd edition of the book A++ The Smallest Programming Language in the World (292 pages) was published in 2018.

History 
A++ was developed by Georg P. Loczewski and Britain Hamm in the years from 1996 - 2002 working as a software developer for Bull's Software-Haus in Langen, Germany and as a freelance programmer with the purpose to serve as a learning instrument rather than as a programming language used to solve practical problems.

The development of A++ is based on the 'Lambda Calculus' by Alonzo Church and is influenced by Guy L. Steele's Programming Language Scheme.

A++ is intended to be an effective tool to become familiar with the core of programming and with programming patterns that can be applied in other languages needed to face the real world.

Publications 
The first published documentation appeared in German in January 2003 with the title 'Programmierung pur --- Programmieren fundamental und ohne Grenzen' ('Undiluted Programming') (919 pages) .

In the year 2005 followed an introduction to A++ in English with the title: 'A++ The Smallest Programming Language in the World --- An Educational Language (242 pages) .

Purpose 
A++ is a language similar to C++, with its interpreter available in Scheme, Java, C, C++ and Python, and offers an ideal environment for basic training in programming, enforcing rigorous confrontation with the essentials of programming languages.

Constitutive principles 
 ARS (basic operations)
 Abstraction
 + Reference
 + Synthesis
 Lexical scope
 Closure

Programming paradigms supported 
 Functional programming, (directly supported)
 (writing expressions to be evaluated),
 Object-oriented programming (directly supported)
 (sending messages to objects),
 Imperative programming (directly supported)
 (writing statements to be executed), including structured programming.
 Logic programming (indirectly supported)
 (rule based programming)

Core features 
 Logical abstractions
 (true, false, if, not, and, or),
 Numerical abstractions
 (natural numbers, zerop, succ, pred, add, sub, mult),
 Relational abstractions,
 (equalp, gtp, ltp, gep)
 Recursion,
 Creation and processing of lists
 (cons, car, cdr, nil, nullp, llength, remove, nth, assoc),
 Higher order functions
 (compose, curry, map, mapc, map2, filter, locate, for-each),
 Set operations
 (memberp, union, addelt),
 Iterative control structure
 ('while').

Development of applications with A++ 
The purpose of A++ is not to be used as a programming language to write applications for the needs of the real world. Nevertheless, it is possible to write simple application programs in A++ like object oriented implementations of a simple account handling and a library management system.

To write real world application programs the language ARS++ is provided, which extends A++ to a language similar to Scheme. ARS++ is derived from ARS plus Scheme plus Extensions.

See also 
The information on the following internal Link referring to ARS++ and ARS-Based Programming  may not be up-to-date or accurate. It is recommended to use the following external link instead:

ARS-based programming and ARS++:
 ARS-based programming
 Educational programming language
 ARS++

References

External links 
 A++ Official Web-Site
 The A++ Book (online-edition)
 ARS/ARS++ Web-Site
 The Lambda Calculus and A++

Educational programming languages